I'm Off Then is a 2015 German film directed by Julia von Heinz, based on the book I'm Off Then: Losing and Finding Myself on the Camino de Santiago by Hape Kerkeling.

Cast
 Devid Striesow as Hape Kerkeling
 Noah Wiechers as teenager Hape
 Luis Kain as young Hape
 Martina Gedeck as Stella
 Karoline Schuch as Lena
 Katharina Thalbach as Omma Bertha
 Annette Frier as Dörte
 Anna Stieblich as Babbel
 Heiko Pinkowski as Bernd
 Inez Bjørg David as Siri
 Julia Engelmann as Line
 Moritz Knapp as Achim
 Birol Ünel as Americo

Accolades

References

External links 
 

2015 films
2010s German-language films
German adventure comedy-drama films
2010s adventure comedy-drama films
German road comedy-drama films

2010s road comedy-drama films
Camino de Santiago
Films based on biographies
Films set in Spain
Films about comedians
Films about writers
2010s German films